Mesonauta, the flag cichlids, is a small genus of cichlids native to the Amazon, Orinoco, Essequibo, Paraná and Paraguay basins in South America. Mesonauta is included in the subfamily Cichlasomatinae. They occur in various freshwater habitats such as streams and lakes, especially in areas with little water movement and aquatic vegetation. They are generally found in small groups that stay near the water surface. To avoid predators, adults may jump out of the water and juveniles mimic leaves.

Some species are popular in the fishkeeping hobby and are frequently kept in aquariums. These have traditionally been referred to as M. festivus, but following taxonomic reviews of the genus in 1991 and 1998, the species most often seen in the aquarium trade are M. guyanae, M. insignis and M. mirificus. The species are similar in general appearance, but they have different distributions and can be separated by the bars they show on the body when stressed or excited (very faint when relaxed).

Species
There are currently six recognized species in this genus:
 Mesonauta acora (Castelnau, 1855)
 Mesonauta egregius S. O. Kullander & Silfvergrip, 1991
 Mesonauta festivus (Heckel, 1840) (Flag cichlid)
 Mesonauta guyanae I. Schindler, 1998	  
 Mesonauta insignis (Heckel, 1840) ("Acará")
 Mesonauta mirificus S. O. Kullander & Silfvergrip, 1991

See also
List of freshwater aquarium fish species

References 

 
Heroini
Cichlid genera
Freshwater fish of South America
Taxa named by Albert Günther